Close to You is a 1960 studio album by Sarah Vaughan, arranged by Belford Hendricks and Fred Norman.

Track listing
"Say It Isn't So" (Irving Berlin) - 2:47
"Missing You" (Ronnell Bright) - 2:50
"I've Got to Talk to My Heart" (Bright) - 2:56
"I'll Never Be The Same" (Matty Malneck, Frank Signorelli, Gus Kahn) - 2:24
"There's No You" (Tom Adair, Hal Hopper) - 2:20
"I Should Care" (Sammy Cahn, Axel Stordahl, Paul Weston) - 3:23
"If You Are But a Dream" (Moe Jaffe, Jack Fulton, Nat Bonx) - 2:47
"Maybe You'll Be There" (Rube Bloom, Sammy Gallop) - 2:50
"Out of This World" (Harold Arlen, Johnny Mercer) - 2:28
"Last Night When We Were Young" (Arlen, Yip Harburg) - 2:50
"Funny"  (Irving Reid, Ira Kosloff, Gwynn Elias) - 2:55
"Close to You" (Jerry Livingston, Carl Lampl, Al Hoffman) - 3:03

Personnel
Sarah Vaughan - vocals
Belford Hendricks - arranger, conductor
Fred Norman

References

Sarah Vaughan albums
1960 albums
Mercury Records albums
Albums conducted by Belford Hendricks
Albums arranged by Belford Hendricks